Notogamasellus is a genus of mites in the family Ologamasidae. There is at least one described species in Notogamasellus, N. vandenbergi.

References

Ologamasidae
Articles created by Qbugbot